George James Chanos (born August 3, 1958) is an American attorney and politician who served as the 31st Nevada Attorney General from 2005 to 2007.

Early life and education
Chanos was born in Wauwatosa, Wisconsin. He earned a bachelor's degree from the University of Nevada, Las Vegas in 1981 and a Juris Doctor from the University of San Diego School of Law in 1985.

Career 
As an undergraduate, Chanos worked as an intern in the U.S. Senate office on Paul Laxalt. After graduating from law school, Chanos worked as an attorney at Finley, Kumble, Wagner, Heine, Underberg, Manley, Myerson & Casey in San Diego.

Chanos was appointed by Governor Kenny Guinn on October 26, 2005 to fill out the term of his predecessor, Brian Sandoval, who became a federal district judge. He also created a moderately successful trivia board game known as Notable Quotables on December 28, 1990. He was a member of the Republican Party.

On December 26, 2012, Chanos wrote an article on The Huffington Post, advocating for limits on the sale of military style assault weapons via gun control.

Personal life
Chanos is married with one daughter. Chanos is of Greek ancestry.

References

External links

1950 births
Living people
American gun control activists
American people of Greek descent
Nevada Attorneys General
Nevada lawyers
Nevada Independents
Nevada Republicans
People from the Las Vegas Valley
People from Wauwatosa, Wisconsin
University of Nevada, Las Vegas alumni
University of San Diego School of Law alumni